Hits Album is an album by American rock band Creedence Clearwater Revival, released in 1981.

Track listing
All songs are written by John Fogerty, except where noted.

Personnel
 John Fogerty - guitar, vocals
 Tom Fogerty - guitar, vocals (except track 15)
 Stu Cook - bass
 Doug Clifford - drums

References

1981 greatest hits albums
Creedence Clearwater Revival compilation albums
Fantasy Records compilation albums
Albums produced by John Fogerty
Albums produced by Stu Cook
Albums produced by Doug Clifford
Albums produced by Saul Zaentz